Réunion is not a separate territory but a region of France. France has a multi-party system, with numerous parties in which no one party often has a chance of gaining power alone, and parties must work with each other to form coalition governments.

For further details see the article: Politics of France.

The parties

Most of the French political parties are active in Réunion.

In addition there are the following regional parties:

 Communist Party of Réunion (Parti communiste réunionnais, or PCR)
For Réunion (Pour La Réunion)
Le Progrès

See also

 Lists of political parties

 
Political parties
+Reunion
Reunion
Government of Réunion

Political parties